Effets de soir (also called effets de soir et de matin) are the effects of light caused by the sunset, twilight, or darkness of the early evening or matins. They appear frequently in works by such painters as Vincent van Gogh, Bernhard Fries, Armand Guillaumin,  and Camille Corot. Literally, it means "effects of evening" in French.

This was part of a group of techniques used by Impressionists such as impasto, en plein air, color theory, and thick strokes of oil paint on canvas.

In 2008, the Museum of Modern Art curated a major exhibit of van Gogh's work of effets de soir.
The exhibit included such iconic paintings as The Potato Eaters, The Sower (Van Gogh), Starry Night Over the RhoneThe Starry Night, and The Night Cafe.

See also
 Blue hour
 Twilight

Gallery of images
All of the following are by Vincent van Gogh, unless otherwise noted:

References

External links
 MoMA website
 The Potato Eaters by Vincent van Gogh

Art history
Paintings by Vincent van Gogh
French words and phrases
Composition in visual art